They Might Be Giants (often abbreviated as TMBG) is an American alternative rock band formed in 1982 by John Flansburgh and John Linnell. During TMBG's early years, Flansburgh and Linnell frequently performed as a duo, often accompanied by a drum machine. In the early 1990s, TMBG expanded to include a backing band. The duo has been credited as vital in the creation and growth of the prolific DIY music scene in Brooklyn in the mid-1980s; the duo's current backing band consists of Marty Beller, Dan Miller and Danny Weinkauf.

The group have been noted for their unique style of alternative music, typically using surreal, humorous lyrics, experimental styles and unconventional instruments in their songs. Over their career, they have found success on the modern rock and college radio charts. They have also found success in children's music with several educational albums, and in theme music for television programs and films.

TMBG have released 23 studio albums. Flood has been certified platinum, while their children's music albums Here Come the ABCs, Here Come the 123s, and Here Comes Science have all been certified gold. The group has won two Grammy Awards. They were nominated for a Tony Award for Best Original Score (Music and/or Lyrics) Written for the Theatre for SpongeBob SquarePants: The Broadway Musical. In total, the group has sold over 4 million records.

History

John Linnell and Flansburgh first met as teenagers growing up in Lincoln, Massachusetts. They began writing songs together while attending Lincoln-Sudbury Regional High School but did not form a band at that time. The two attended separate colleges after high school and Linnell joined The Mundanes, a new wave group from Rhode Island. The two reunited in 1981 after moving to Brooklyn (to the same apartment building on the same day) to continue their career.

Earlier years (1982–1989)
At their first concert, They Might Be Giants were introduced as and performed under the name El Grupo De Rock and Roll (Spanish for "the Rock and Roll Band"), because the show was a Sandinista rally in Central Park, and a majority of the audience members spoke Spanish. Soon discarding this name, the band assumed the name of a 1971 film They Might Be Giants (starring George C. Scott and Joanne Woodward), which is in turn taken from a Don Quixote passage about how Quixote mistook windmills for evil giants. According to Dave Wilson, in his book Rock Formations, the name They Might Be Giants had been used and subsequently discarded by a friend of the band who had a ventriloquism act. The name was then adopted by the band, who had been searching for a suitable name.

A common misconception is that the name of the band is a reference to themselves and an allusion to future success. In an interview, John Flansburgh said that the words "they might be giants" are just a very outward-looking forward thing which they liked. He clarified this in the documentary movie Gigantic (A Tale of Two Johns) by explaining that the name refers to the outside world of possibilities that they saw as a fledgling band. In an earlier radio interview, John Linnell described the phrase as "something very paranoid sounding".

The duo began performing their own music in and around New York City – Flansburgh on guitar, Linnell on accordion and saxophone and accompanied by a drum machine or prerecorded backing track on audio cassette. Their atypical instrumentation, along with their songs which featured unusual subject matter and clever wordplay, soon attracted a strong local following. Their performances also featured absurdly comical stage props such as oversized fezzes and large cardboard cutout heads of newspaper editor William Allen White. Many of these props would later turn up in their first music videos. From 1984 to 1987, They Might Be Giants were the house-band at Darinka, a Lower East Side performance club  run by Gary Ray. One weekend a month they played on the stage there and by the end of their three-year stint sold out every performance. On March 30, 1985, TMBG released their 7" flexi-disc, dubbed "Wiggle Diskette" at Darinka. The disc included demos of the songs "Everything Right Is Wrong Again" and "You'll Miss Me".

Dial-A-Song (1985–2008)

At one point, Linnell broke his wrist in a biking accident, and Flansburgh's apartment was burgled, stopping them from performing for a time. During this hiatus, they began recording their songs onto an answering machine, and then advertising the phone number in local newspapers such as The Village Voice, using the moniker "Dial-A-Song". They also released a demo cassette, which earned them a review in People magazine. The review caught the attention of Bar/None Records, who signed them to a recording deal.

Through the 1980s until 1998, Dial-A-Song consisted of an answering machine with a tape of the band playing various songs. The machine played one track at a time, ranging from demos and uncompleted work to mock advertisements the band had created. It was often difficult to access due to the popularity of the service and the dubious quality of the machines used. In reference to this, one of Dial-A-Song's many slogans over the years was the tongue-in-cheek "Always Busy, Often Broken". The number, (718) 387–6962, was a local Brooklyn number and was charged accordingly, but the band advertised it with the line: "Free when you call from work".

At one point in 1988, the Dial-A-Song answering machine recorded a conversation between two people who had listened to Dial-A-Song, then questioned how they made money out of it. An excerpt from the conversation has been included as a hidden track on the EP for (She Was A) Hotel Detective. In the late '90s, TMBG started switching to a digital unit to update the format for Dial-A-Song, but due to frequent crashes, the band returned to the original format.

In March 2000, TMBG started the website dialasong.com, which was more reliable than the original, phone-based version, as it used a Flash document to stream the songs.

In 2002, Dial-A-Song's answering machine broke down, and fans responded by sending new similar models. In the following year, Dial-A-Song resumed service with a new answering machine. By 2005, a computer system from TechTV was provided to maintain the system, but technical difficulties started bringing the system to an end.

In 2006, Dial-A-Song became increasingly difficult to maintain as a result of unreliable answering machines that had to be replaced. The stress placed upon the answering machine in addition to its age caused excessive wear, and the machine broke down soon after. In August, Dial-A-Song ceased production and because fans started taking advantage of the internet, it was replaced with a page promoting the They Might Be Giants podcasts.

John Linnell stated in an interview in early 2008 that Dial-A-Song had died of a technical crash, and that the Internet had taken over where the machine left off. On November 15, 2008, the Dial-A-Song number was officially disconnected, though the number has at times been re-used in a similar style by other independent artists.

In 2015, Dial-A-Song was reactivated.

They Might Be Giants and Lincoln (1986–1989)
The duo released their self-titled debut album in 1986, which became a college radio hit. The video for "Don't Let's Start", filmed in the New York State Pavilion built for the 1964 New York World's Fair in Queens, became a hit on MTV in 1987, earning them a broader following. In 1988, they released their second album, Lincoln, named after the duo's hometown. It featured the song "Ana Ng" which reached No. 11 on the US Modern Rock chart. Both albums were produced on 8-track tape at Dubway Studios in New York City.

Move to Elektra (1989–1992)

In 1989, They Might Be Giants signed with Elektra Records and released their third album Flood the following year. Flood earned them a platinum album, largely thanks to the success of "Birdhouse in Your Soul" which reached number three on the U.S. Modern Rock chart, as well as "Istanbul (Not Constantinople)," a cover of a song originally recorded by the Four Lads.

In 1990, Throttle magazine interviewed They Might Be Giants and clarified the meaning of the song "Ana Ng": John Flansburgh said, "Ng is a Vietnamese name. The song is about someone who's thinking about a person on the exact opposite side of the world. John looked at a globe and figured out that if Ana Ng is in Vietnam and the person is on the other side of the world, then it must be written by someone in Peru".

Further interest in the band was generated when two cartoon music videos were created by Warner Bros. Animation for Tiny Toon Adventures: "Istanbul" and "Particle Man". The videos reflected TMBG's high "kid appeal", resulting from their often absurd songs and pop melodies.

In 1991, Bar/None Records released the B-sides compilation Miscellaneous T.  The title referred to the section of the record store where TMBG releases were often found as well as to the overall eclectic nature of the tracks. Though consisting of previously released material (save for the "Purple Toupee" B-sides, which were not available publicly), it gave new fans a chance to hear the Johns' earlier non-album work without having to hunt down the individual EPs.

In early 1992, They Might Be Giants released Apollo 18. The heavy space theme coincided with TMBG being named Musical Ambassadors for International Space Year. Singles from the album included "The Statue Got Me High", "I Palindrome I", and "The Guitar (The Lion Sleeps Tonight)". Apollo 18 was also notable for being one of the first albums to take advantage of the CD player's shuffle feature. The song "Fingertips" actually comprised 21 separate tracks — short snippets that not only acted together to make the song but that when played in random order would be interspersed between the album's full-length songs. Due to mastering errors, the U.K. and Australian versions of Apollo 18 contained "Fingertips" as one track.

Recruiting a band (1992–1998)
Following Apollo 18, for live shows, Flansburgh and Linnell (who themselves play the guitar and accordion or sax, respectively) decided to move away from recorded backing tracks and recruited a supporting band (Kurt Hoffman of The Ordinaires on reeds and keyboards, longtime Pere Ubu bassist Tony Maimone, and drummer Jonathan Feinberg).

John Henry was released in 1994. Influenced by their more conventional lineup, this album marked a departure from their previous releases with more of a guitar-heavy sound. It was released to mixed reviews amongst fans and critics alike.

Their next album, Factory Showroom, was released in 1996 to little fanfare. The band had quickly moved away from the feel of John Henry, and Factory Showroom returns to the more diverse sounds of their earlier albums, despite the inclusion of two guitarists, the second being Eric Schermerhorn who provided several guitar solos.

They left Elektra after the duo refused to do a publicity show, amongst other exposure-related disputes.

In 1998, they released a mostly live album Severe Tire Damage from which came the single "Doctor Worm," a studio recording.

Around this same time period, Danny Weinkauf (bass) and Dan Miller (guitar) were recruited for their recording and touring band. Both had been members of the bands Lincoln and Candy Butchers which were previous opening acts for TMBG. Weinkauf and Miller continue to work with the band to the present day.

Beyond Elektra and move to Restless Records (1999–2003)
For most of their career, TMBG has made innovative use of the Internet. As early as 1992, the band was sending news updates to their fans via Usenet newsgroups. In 1999, They Might Be Giants became the first major-label recording artist to release an entire album exclusively in MP3 format. The album, Long Tall Weekend, is sold through Emusic.

Also, in 1999, the band contributed the song "Dr. Evil" to the motion picture Austin Powers: The Spy Who Shagged Me. Over their career, the band has performed on numerous movie and television soundtracks, including The Oblongs, the ABC News miniseries Brave New World and Ed and His Dead Mother. They also performed the theme music "Dog on Fire", composed by Bob Mould, for The Daily Show with Jon Stewart.
They composed and performed the music for the TLC series Resident Life, the theme song for the Disney Channel program Higglytown Heroes, and songs about the cartoons Dexter's Laboratory and Courage the Cowardly Dog.

During this time, the band also worked on a project for McSweeney's, a publishing company and literary journal. The band wrote a McSweeney's theme song and forty-four songs for an album that was meant to be listened to with the journal, with each track corresponding to a particular story or piece of artwork. Labeled They Might Be Giants vs. McSweeney's, the disk appears in issue No. 6 of Timothy McSweeney's Quarterly Concern.

Contributing the single "Boss of Me" as the theme song to the hit television series Malcolm in the Middle, as well as to the show's compilation CD, brought a new audience to the band. Not only did the band contribute the theme, songs from all of the Giants' previous albums were used on the show: for example, the infamous punching-the-kid-in-the-wheelchair scene from the first episode was done to the strains of "Pencil Rain" from Lincoln. Another song to feature in the series was "Spiraling Shape". "Boss of Me" became the band's second top-40 hit in the UK which they performed on long-running UK television programme Top of the Pops, and in 2002, won the duo a Grammy Award.

On September 11, 2001, they released the album Mink Car on Restless Records. It was their first full album release of new studio material since 1996 and their first since parting ways with Elektra. The making of that album, including a record signing event at a Manhattan Tower Records, was included in a documentary directed by A. J. Schnack titled Gigantic (A Tale of Two Johns). The film was released on DVD in 2003.

In 2002, they released No!, their first album "for the entire family". Using the enhanced CD format, it included an interactive animation for most of the songs. They followed it up in 2003 with their first book, an illustrated children's book with an included EP, Bed, Bed, Bed.

Podcasting, independent releases, and children's music (2004–2015)

In 2004, the band created one of the first artist-owned online music stores, at which customers could purchase and download MP3 copies of their music, both new releases and many previously released albums. By creating their own store, the band could keep money that would otherwise go to record companies. With the redesign of the band's website in 2010, the store was reincarnated.

Also, in 2004, the band released its first new "adult" rock work since the release of No!, the EP Indestructible Object. This was followed by a new album, The Spine, and an associated EP, The Spine Surfs Alone. It was at this time that Dan Hickey was replaced by Marty Beller, who had previously collaborated with TMBG. For the album's first single, "Experimental Film", TMBG teamed up with Homestar Runner creators Matt and Mike Chapman to create an animated music video. The band's collaboration with the Brothers Chaps also included several Puppet Jam segments with puppet Homestar and the music for a Strong Bad email titled "Different Town". In 2006 they recorded a track for the 200th Strong Bad e-mail, where Linnell provided the voice of The Poopsmith.

TMBG also contributed a track to the 2004 Future Soundtrack for America compilation, a project compiled by John Flansburgh with the help of Spike Jonze and Barsuk Records. The band contributed "Tippecanoe and Tyler Too", a political campaign song from the presidential election of 1840. The compilation was released by Barsuk and featured indie, alternative, and high-profile acts such as Death Cab for Cutie, The Flaming Lips, and Bright Eyes. All proceeds went to progressive organizations such as Music for America and MoveOn.org.

Flansburgh and Linnell made a guest appearance in "Camp", the January 11, 2004, episode of the animated sitcom Home Movies. They voice both a pair of camp counselors and members of a strange hooded male bonding cult. On May 10, 2004, they made a guest appearance on the final episode of Blue's Clues called "Bluestock" alongside Toni Braxton, Macy Gray, and India.Arie. They Might Be Giants were in a letter for Joe and Blue.

Following the Spine on the Hiway Tour of 2004, the band announced that they would take an extended hiatus from touring to focus on other projects, such as a musical produced by Flansburgh and written by his wife, Robin "Goldie" Goldwasser, titled People Are Wrong!.

2005 saw the release of Here Come the ABCs, TMBG's follow-up to the successful children's album No!. The Disney Sound label released the CD and DVD separately on February 15, 2005. To promote the album, Flansburgh and Linnell along with drummer Marty Beller embarked on a short tour, performing for free at many Borders Bookstore locations.  In November 2005, Venue Songs was released as a two-disc CD/DVD set narrated by John Hodgman. It is a concept album based on all of the "venue songs" from their 2004 tour.

TMBG covered the Devo song "Through Being Cool" in the 2005 Disney film Sky High.  In 2008, they rerecorded the song "Take Out The Trash" (from The Else) in Simlish for inclusion in The Sims 2: Freetime.

From 2005 to 2014, They Might Be Giants made podcasts on a monthly, sometimes bi-monthly, basis. Each edition included remixes of previous songs, rarities, covers, and new songs and skits recorded specifically for the podcast.

The band contributed 14 original songs for the 2006 Dunkin' Donuts ad campaign, "America Runs on Dunkin'", including "Things I Like to Do", "Pleather", and "Fritalian". In the aired advertisement, Flansburgh sings "Fritalian" along with his wife, Robin Goldwasser. In a 2008 commercial, "Moving" is played.

The band has produced and performed three original songs for Playhouse Disney series: one for Higglytown Heroes and two for Mickey Mouse Clubhouse. The Mickey Mouse Clubhouse features two original songs performed by group, including the opening theme song, in which a variant of a Mickey Mouse Club chant ("Meeska Mooska Mickey Mouse!") is used to summon the Clubhouse, and "Hot Dog!", the song used at the end of the show.  The song references Mickey's first spoken words in the 1929 short The Karnival Kid.

They also recorded a cover of the Disney song, "There's a Great Big Beautiful Tomorrow" for the film Meet the Robinsons and wrote and performed the theme song for The Drinky Crow Show. The band was recruited to provide original songs for the Henry Selick-directed film adaptation of Neil Gaiman's children's book Coraline but were dropped because their music was not "creepy" enough. Only one song, titled "Other Father Song", was kept for the film with Linnell singing as the titular "Other Father".

Their twelfth album, The Else, was released July 10, 2007, on Idlewild Recordings (and distributed by Zoë Records for the CD version), with an earlier digital release on May 15 at the iTunes Store. Advance copies were made available to stations by mid-June 2007.  The album was produced by Pat Dillett (David Byrne) and the Dust Brothers (Beck, Beastie Boys). On February 12, 2009, They Might Be Giants performed the song "The Mesopotamians" from the album on Late Night with Conan O'Brien.

In the rest of 2007, They Might Be Giants wrote a commissioned piece for Brooklyn-based robotic music outfit League of Electronic Musical Urban Robots and performed for three dates at the event, and covered the Pixies "Havalina" for American Laundromat Records Dig For Fire - a tribute to PIXIES compilation.

The band's 13th album, Here Come the 123s, a DVD/CD follow-up to 2005's critically acclaimed Here Come the ABCs children's project, was released on February 5, 2008. On April 10, 2008, They Might Be Giants performed the song "Seven" from the album on Late Night with Conan O'Brien. In 2009, the album won the Grammy Award for "Best Musical Album For Children" during the 51st Annual Grammy Awards.

The band's fourteenth album, Here Comes Science, a science-themed children's album. This album introduced listeners to natural, formal, social, and applied sciences.  It was released on September 1, 2009, and nominated for a Grammy Award on December 1, 2010.

On November 3, They Might Be Giants sent out a newsletter stating, "The Avatars of They", a set of sock puppets the Johns manipulate for shows, would have an album in 2012, suggesting another children's album. However, a new adult album titled Join Us was released on July 19, 2011.

On October 3, 2011, Artix Entertainment announced that the band would be performing in-game for a special musical event to commemorate the 3rd birthday of their popular MMORPG AdventureQuest Worlds. They were featured in AdventureQuest World's special third birthday event as John and John.

On March 5, 2013, the band released their sixteenth adult studio album, Nanobots, on their Idlewild Recordings label in the US and on British indie label Lojinx in Europe.

The live album Flood Live in Australia was made available for free digital download by the band in 2015. Also in 2015, the band reactivated its Dial-A-Song service under the banner of Dial-A-Song-Direct, promising to release one new song every week for the entire year, beginning with the track "Erase" on January 5.  Several of these songs were planned to be collected on a new studio rock album entitled Glean on April 21, 2015.

The band released their newest children's album, Why?, on November 27, 2015. It was their fifth children's album and the first children's album to be released under their own label, Idlewild Recordings.

In a video released on December 20, 2015, John Flansburgh announced that the band would be taking a temporary break following their 2016 U.S. tour.

Dial-A-Song revival, Phone Power, I Like Fun, and Book (2015–present)

Dial-A-Song was revived in 2015, with a new phone number ((844) 387–6962), the website, and a radio network. In late 2017, the band announced via Twitter that Dial-A-Song would return again, in a modified format, starting in January 2018.

On March 8, 2016, the band released Phone Power, their nineteenth studio album and the third containing songs from the 2015 revival of their Dial-a-Song service. This was the first TMBG album to be sold as a "pay what you want" download, available ahead of the physical release on June 10.
The band's twentieth album, I Like Fun was released on January 19, 2018. Their twenty-first and twenty-second studio albums, My Murdered Remains and The Escape Team, were both released on December 10, 2018. My Murdered Remains contains songs from the 2015 and 2018 iterations of Dial-A-Song. 

They made a song "I'm Not a Loser" for the SpongeBob SquarePants musical in 2016.

In October 2019, the band recorded a new version of their song "Hot Dog" for the third season of the Disney Channel preschool series Mickey and the Roadster Racers, re-titled as Mickey Mouse Mixed-Up Adventures for that season. It premiered on Disney Junior on October 14, 2019.

In July 2020, the band announced that they would be releasing an album titled Book in 2021. The album was released on November 12, 2021.

In August 2020, the band recorded a song for a CNN documentary about the electoral college.

The band announced a 30th anniversary Flood tour for 2020, however it was postponed, and dates were rescheduled several times due to the COVID pandemic. Shortly after resuming live tours again in June 2022, John Flansburgh was involved in a car accident while on his way home from the June 8 concert.  He suffered several broken ribs but had a positive prognosis from doctors.  Several tour dates were again postponed while he recovered, however the tour has since resumed.

In November 2022, Book was nominated for a 65th Annual Grammy Awards in the category of "Best Boxed or Special Limited-Edition Package"

Members

Lead members
 John Flansburgh – vocals, guitar (1982–present), bass (1982–1992)
 John Linnell – vocals, accordion, keyboards, woodwinds (1982–present)
Current backing band
 Dan Miller – guitar, keyboards, backing vocals (1998–present)
 Danny Weinkauf – bass guitar, keyboards (1998–present)
 Marty Beller – drums, percussion (2004–present)
Occasional backing band members
 Curt Ramm – trumpet, valve trombone, euphonium
 Dan Levine – trombone, euphonium, tuba
 Stan Harrison – saxophones, clarinet, bass clarinet, flute
 Mark Pender – trumpet

Former backing band members
 Kurt Hoffman – keyboards, woodwinds (1992–1994)
 Tony Maimone – bass guitar (1992–1995)
 Jonathan Feinberg – drums (1992)
 Brian Doherty – drums (1993–1997)
 Graham Maby – bass guitar (1996–1997)
 Eric Schermerhorn – guitar (1996–1998)
 Dan Hickey – drums (1997–2004)
 Hal Cragin – bass guitar (1997–1998)

Timeline

Discography

Throughout their career, They Might Be Giants have released 23 studio albums, 10 compilations, 10 live albums, 8 EPs, and 11 singles.

Original albums
 They Might Be Giants (1986)
 Lincoln (1988)
 Flood (1990)
 Apollo 18 (1992)
 John Henry (1994)
 Factory Showroom (1996)
 Long Tall Weekend (1999)
 Mink Car (2001)
 The Spine (2004)
 The Else (2007)
 Join Us (2011)
 Nanobots (2013)
 Glean (2015)
 Phone Power (2016)
 I Like Fun (2018)
 My Murdered Remains (2018)
 The Escape Team (2018)
 Book (2021)

Children's albums
 No! (2002)
 Here Come the ABCs (2005)
 Here Come the 123s (2008)
 Here Comes Science (2009)
 Why? (2015)

See also
 List of songwriter duos

References

External links

 
 
 This Might Be A Wiki – a wiki about TMBG
 
 This American Life – Episode 90: Telephone in Act Two: When The Telephone Is Your Medium by contributing editor Sarah Vowell.  A story and interview that includes the Dial-a-Song line and the role the line had on TMBG music.
 

 
1982 establishments in the United States
Alternative rock groups from New York (state)
American children's musical groups
American surrealist artists
Surrealist groups
American musical duos
American podcasters
Elektra Records artists
Geek rock groups
Grammy Award winners
Indie rock musical groups from New York (state)
Lojinx artists
Musical groups established in 1982
Rock music duos
Rough Trade Records artists
Walt Disney Records artists
Zoë Records artists
Restless Records artists
Rounder Records artists
Barsuk Records artists
Bar/None Records artists
Megaforce Records artists